The 1951 TCU Horned Frogs football team represented Texas Christian University (TCU) in the 1951 college football season. The Horned Frogs finished the season 6–5 overall and 5–1 in the Southwest Conference. The team was coached by Dutch Meyer in his eighteenth year as head coach. The Frogs played their home games in Amon G. Carter Stadium, which is located on campus in Fort Worth, Texas. They were invited to the Cotton Bowl Classic where they lost to Kentucky by a score of 7–20.

Schedule

References

TCU
TCU Horned Frogs football seasons
Southwest Conference football champion seasons
TCU Horned Frogs football